I Was Stronger (Serbo-Croat: Bila sam jaca) is a 1953 Yugoslav war drama film directed by Gustav Gavrin and starring Sava Severova, Mira Stupica and Nikola Popovic. The film's heroine is a Partisan doctor during the Second World War.

Cast
 Sava Severova as Marija .. doktorka  
 Mira Stupica as Zora  
 Nikola Popovic as Nacelnik ... Zorin muz 
 Rade Brasanac 
 Bozidar Drnic as Apotekar  
 Ivo Jaksic as Nemacki major  
 Ljubisa Jovanovic 
 Bozidar Marjanovic as Bora ... Zorin sin  
 Miodrag Naunovic 
 Fran Novakovic 
 Aleksandar Ognjanovic 
 Ljuba Tadic as Agent  
 Mladen 'Mladja' Veselinovic

References

Bibliography 
 Alfred Krautz. International Directory of Cinematographers, Set- and Costume Designers in Film: Albania, Bulgaria, Greece, Rumania, Yugoslavia. Saur, 1983.

External links 
 

1953 films
1950s war drama films
Yugoslav war drama films
Serbo-Croatian-language films
1953 drama films
Films set in Yugoslavia
War films set in Partisan Yugoslavia
Yugoslav black-and-white films
Yugoslav World War II films